Loring-Wyle Parkette is a small plot of land, on the northeast corner of the Mount Pleasant Road and St. Clair Avenue East intersection in Toronto's Moore Park neighbourhood, dedicated to the art and memory of two famous Toronto sculptors: Frances Loring (1887–1968) and Florence Wyle (1881–1968). Until October 1976, the long, narrow property served as the Moore Park Loop turnaround for the Toronto Transit Commission's Mount Pleasant streetcar.

The parkette, established in 1984 at the request of the Moore Park Residents' Association, is located one block north of the converted church schoolhouse at 110 Glenrose Avenue that served as the artists' studio. The parkette contains busts of both women, each modeled by the other. In addition, there are two sculptures done by Wyle: Young Girl (1938) and Harvester (1940).

Gallery of sculptures

See also
 List of Toronto parks
 Queen Elizabeth Way Monument
 Toronto Sculpture Garden

References

External links
 
 A website with information about the founding of the parkette 
 Florence Wyle at the Art History Archive

Parks in Toronto